Jamie F. Mueller (born October 4, 1964) is an American football player. He worked as  running back who played in the National Football League (NFL) for the Buffalo Bills from 1987 to 1992.

Career 
Mueller played college football at Tiny Benedictine College in Atchison, Kansas where he was a two-time NAIA All-American.

Mueller played in 57 career games for Buffalo, with 38 starts. He had 238 rushes, accumulating 901 yards and 4 rushing touchdowns and 1 receiving TD. He started as fullback in Super Bowl XXV vs. the NY Giants.

As a rookie, he was Buffalo's second-leading ground gainer and a leading special teams player every year. Mueller averaged 3.8 yards per attempt and 15.8 yards per game. His longest career run was 20 yards. With 4.2 attempts per game, Mueller also tacked up 28 receptions for 169 yards and a touchdown in his career, with a 6.0 yard per reception average. His longest career reception was of 30 yards.

One of his biggest plays came with Mueller catching last-minute touchdown Vs. the Jets in 1990, clinching home field throughout the playoffs.

Mueller returned kicks for Buffalo on various occasions. In his career, he had 6 returns for 93 yards. His longest return was of 20 yards. Mueller had nine fumbles.

Mueller was one of the all-time strongest NFL players with a power-lift triple total of 1,865 lbs.

 700 LB Squat
 700 LB Deadlift
 465 LB Bench

He ran 4.4-second 40-yard dash at 220 lbs.

Mueller was a leading blocker or runner in most critical short yardage situations with 80% success rate.

Mueller was awarded 7 game balls in his career, which was ended by a neck injury.

References 

Stealth Sports Performance

External links 
 

1964 births
Living people
American football running backs
Benedictine Ravens football players
Buffalo Bills players
Players of American football from Cleveland